The Rajasthan Atomic Power Station (RAPS; also Rajasthan Atomic Power Project - RAPP) is located at Rawatbhata in the state of Rajasthan, India.

History 

The construction of the Douglas Point Nuclear Generating Station Canada began in 1961 with a CANDU (Canada Deuterium Uranium) pressurised heavy water reactor (PHWR) capable of producing 220 MW of electricity. Two years after the construction of the Rajasthan Power Project (RAPP) commenced, two similar reactors were built in the state of Rajasthan. Ten years later, in 1973 RAPS-1 was put into service. In 1974 after India conducted Smiling Buddha, its first nuclear weapons test Canada stopped its support of the project, delaying the commissioning of RAPS-2 until 1981.

In the context of the Indian atomic program, two more PHWR with an output of 220 MW each were built.  They cost around 570 million dollars.  RAPS-3 became critical on 24 December 1999, RAPS-4 became critical on 3 November 2000.  Commercial operations began on 1 June 2000 for unit 3, and on 23 December 2000 for unit 4.

Two more reactors (RAPS-5 and RAPS-6) with 220 MWe have also been built, with unit 5 beginning commercial operation on 4 February 2010, and unit 6 on 31 March 2010.

Two of the new Indian-designed 700 MWe series of the reactor (RAPP-7 and RAPP-8) are under construction in Rajasthan.

In November 2012, the International Atomic Energy Agency (IAEA) intensively audited over several weeks two reactors at the Rajasthan Atomic Power Station for safety. It has been concluded that the reactors are among the best in the world, the indigenously made 220 MW atomic plants can withstand a Fukushima type of accident, even suggesting that the "safety culture is strong in India" and that India emerged a winner with a high global safety rank.

First concrete for unit 7 was poured on 18 July 2011,
with commercial operation expected by 2016. 
The two reactors will cost an estimated Rs 123.2 billion (US$2.6 billion).

Incidents 
By 2003 RAPS-1 had experienced numerous problems due to leaks, cracks in the end-shield and turbine blade failures, had undergone repairs and appeared to be generating 100 MW of electricity, with RAPS-2 reportedly generating 200 MW.

On 29 August 2006, a 90% iron meteorite weighing  fell in Kanvarpura village, near the power station. The Deputy Director-General (western region) of the Geological Survey of India, R.S. Goyal, said that devastation on an "unimaginable scale" would have ensued had the object struck the station. However, the kinetic energy of a meteorite of this size is smaller than that of jet aircraft frequently used as a basis for impact resistance of containment structures.

In June 2012, 38 workers were exposed to tritium when a welding operation went wrong inside the protected environment of the reactor.

Units

See also

Nuclear power in India

References

External links
Juggernaut, a 1968 Canadian documentary on the delivery of the plant's calandria.

Nuclear power stations in Rajasthan
Nuclear power stations using CANDU reactors
Nuclear power stations with reactors under construction
Buildings and structures in Chittorgarh district
Buildings and structures in Kota, Rajasthan
Canada–India relations
1973 establishments in Rajasthan